The 2016 season is Fylkir's 20th season in Úrvalsdeild and their 16th consecutive season in top-flight of Icelandic Football.

Along with competing in the Úrvalsdeild, the club will also participate in the Bikarkeppni karla and the League Cup.

Squad

Out on loan

Transfers

In

Out

Loans in

Loans out

Competitions

Úrvalsdeild

League table

Results summary

Results by matchday

Results

Bikarkeppni karla

Deildabikar

Group stage

Knockout stage

Squad statistics

Appearances and goals

|-
|colspan="14"|Players who appeared for Fylkir but left during the season:

|}

Goal scorers

Disciplinary Record

References

External links
 Fylkir Official Site

Fylkir